Salaberry-Soulanges was a former provincial electoral district in the Montérégie region of Quebec, Canada. It was located to the southwest of the island of Montreal.

It was created for the 1989 election from parts of the former Vaudreuil-Soulanges and Beauharnois electoral districts.  Its final election was in 1998.  It disappeared in the 2003 election as its territory was divided between the new electoral districts of Soulanges and (the newly recreated) Beauharnois.

Members of the National Assembly

External links
Election results
 Election results (National Assembly)
 Election results (QuebecPolitique.com)
Maps
 1992–2001 changes (Flash)

References

Former provincial electoral districts of Quebec